The  ("Book of Causes") is a philosophical work composed in the 9th century that was once attributed to Aristotle and that became popular in the Middle Ages, first in Arabic and Islamic countries and later in the Latin West.  The real authorship remains a mystery, but most of the content is taken from a work by the Neoplatonic philosopher Proclus called Elements of Theology.  This was first noticed by Thomas Aquinas, following William of Moerbeke's translation of Proclus' work into Latin. As such it is now attributed to a pseudo-Aristotle.

Title
The title  came into use following the translation into Latin by Gerard of Cremona. The work was also translated into Armenian and Hebrew. Many Latin commentaries on the work are extant.

References

Text and translations

Arabic
 (edition of the Arabic)
 (edition of the Arabic with German translation)

Latin
 Pattin, Adriaan, Le Liber de Causis. Edition établie a l'aide de 90 manuscrits avec introduction et notes, in Tijdschrift voor Filosofie 28 (1966) pp. 90–203

Hebrew
 Rothschild, Jean-Pierre: Les traductions hébraïques du Liber de causis latin. Dissertation Paris 1985, Bd. 1, S. 172–243 (synoptic edition of parts of the Hebrew translations)

Translations in modern languages
 Albayrak, Mehmet Barış: Nedenler Kitabı (Liber de Causis), Notos Yayınları, 2014. (Türkçe çeviri)
 Baumgarten, Alexander. Pseudo-Aristotel, Liber de causis, traducere, note şi comentariu de Alexander Baumgarten, Univers Enciclopedic, București, 2002 (Romanian translation)
 Brand, Dennis J. (ed.), tr. The Book of Causes: Liber de Causis (English translation): 1st ed. 1984 Marquette University Press, 2nd ed. 2001 Niagara University Press
 Magnard, Pierre; Boulnois, Olivier; Pinchard, Bruno; Solere, Jean-Luc. La demeure de l'être. Autour d'un anonyme. Etude et traduction du Liber de Causis, Paris 1990, Vrin (French translation)
 Schönfeld, Andreas. Liber de causis: Das Buch von den Ursachen, repr. 2005 Meiner Felix Verlag Gmbh : Latin text, German translation

Commentaries
 Albertus Magnus, Liber de causis et processu universitatis a prima causa (Latin)
  (in 2 volumes)
 D'Ancona, Cristina: Tommaso d'Aquino, Commento al Libro delle cause. Rusconi, Milano 1986: commentary by Thomas Aquinas
 Sancti Thomae de Aquino super librum De Causis expositio (Latin)

Secondary literature
 Alonso, Manuel Alonso. Las fuentes literarias del Liber de causis. Al-Andalus: revista de las escuelas de estudios árabes de Madrid y Granada, (10), 1945, pp. 345–382.
 Bächli-Hinz, Andreas. Monotheismus und neuplatonische Philosophie: Eine Untersuchung zum pseudo-aristotelischen Liber de causis und dessen Rezeption durch Albert den Großen, Frankfurt, Academia Verlag, 2002.
  (in 2 volumes)
 
 
 
 D'Ancona, Cristina. Recherches sur le Liber de causis. Vrin, Paris 1995, 
 D'Ancona, Cristina; Taylor, Richard C. "Le Liber de causis", in: Richard Goulet and others (ed.): Dictionnaire des philosophes antiques, CNRS, Paris 2003, S. 599–647
 
 
 Megías, Paloma Llorente. Liber de Causis: Indice y Concordancia, Florence, Olschki 2004.
 Ricklin, Thomas. Die 'Physica' und der 'Liber de causis' im 12. Jahrhundert. Zwei Studien. University press, Freiburg (Switzerland) 1995, 
 Taylor, Richard C. "The Kalām fī maḥḍ al-khair (Liber de causis) in the Islamic Philosophical Milieu" in: Jill Kraye and others (eds.): Pseudo-Aristotle in the Middle Ages, Warburg Institute, London 1986, S. 37–52

See also 
Theology of Aristotle, another 9th-century Arabic adaptation of a Neoplatonic work (Plotinus' Enneads) falsely attributed to Aristotle

External links
 Latin: critical text of Adriaan Pattin (1966) revised by Hans Zimmermann 2001
 Arabic and German text: Bardenhewer edition (1822)
 Latin text (UBB Cluj)
 Latin text (Intratext)
 Editions (Bibliotheca Augustana)

Neoplatonic texts
Early Islamic philosophy
Pseudoaristotelian works